The Taiwan Sugar Museum is a museum about sugar in Ciaotou District, Kaohsiung, Taiwan.

History
The museum building dates back to the Japanese rule of Taiwan when it was constructed as a sugar refinery factory in 1901 and completed in 1902. The factory underwent second and third stages of construction in 1905-1911 and 1911-1945 respectively which focused on the construction of leisure and religious needs of the employees. During World War II, two factories were damaged during bomb raids. They were then restored. Due to the declining of world's sugar price, the factory ceased to operated in 1999. The area was then turned into museum and opened in 2006.

Transportation
The museum is accessible from Ciaotou Sugar Refinery station of the Kaohsiung MRT.

See also
 List of museums in Taiwan
 Taiwan Sugar Museum (Tainan)

References

Museums established in 2006
2006 establishments in Taiwan
Food museums in Taiwan
Museums in Kaohsiung
Sugar museums
Sugar refineries in Taiwan